Julian Calhoun Adams II is an American producer, writer, actor, and architect.

Early life and education
He is the son of Weston Adams and Elizabeth Nelson Adams, and was born in Columbia, South Carolina. He spent his childhood in South Carolina, and Malawi, Africa.  He attended schools in Lilongwe and Blantyre, Malawi.  Adams graduated from The University of the South with a degree in Fine Arts, and also earned his Master of Architecture degree from The Georgia Institute of Technology.  He is the brother of Robert Adams VI, Weston Adams III, and Wallace Adams-Riley.

Film work
Together Julian and Weston founded Solar Filmworks.  In 2007 they produced, wrote, and starred in the feature film, from ThinkFilm, The Last Confederate: The Story of Robert Adams (known as Strike the Tent on the film festival circuit) which is the story of Weston's great grandparents, Robert Adams II, and Eveline McCord (Adams) of Philadelphia (the great grandniece of Betsy Ross). The film also stars Amy Redford, Tippi Hedren, Mickey Rooney, and Edwin McCain.

In 2009, Julian produced the feature music documentary Amy Cook: The Spaces in Between, which was directed by Todd Robinson. It was released by The Documentary Channel.  The film chronicles the Austin, Texas based band's tour from Austin, to Marfa, Terlingua, Las Cruces, White Sands, Tucson, and Los Angeles.

Julian produced (with John Watson, and Pen Densham) and co-starred in Phantom,  from RCR Media Group, Trilogy Entertainment Group and Solar Filmworks. The submarine thriller was written and directed by Todd Robinson, and stars Ed Harris, David Duchovny, William Fichtner, Johnathon Schaech, Sean Patrick Flanery, Jason Beghe, Jason Gray-Stanford, Kip Pardue, Lance Henriksen, and Dagmara Domińczyk.

He produced and acted in The Last Full Measure, from Roadside Attractions, written and directed by Todd Robinson, and starring Samuel L. Jackson, Ed Harris, William Hurt, Christopher Plummer, Sebastian Stan, Jeremy Irvine, Peter Fonda, Diane Ladd, Amy Madigan, Bradley Whitford, and John Savage (actor). In the film, Adams plays the role of Lt. John Quaid.

Acting credits
Massacre at Shelton Laurel (2004)
The Lighter Journey (2007)
The Last Confederate: The Story of Robert Adams (2007)
Phantom (2013)
The Last Full Measure (2019)

Writing credits
The Last Confederate: The Story of Robert Adams (2007)

Producing credits
The Last Confederate: The Story of Robert Adams (2007)
Once Upon a Time in the South: Behind 'The Last Confederate'  (2007)
Amy Cook: The Spaces in Between (2009)
Phantom (2013)
The Last Full Measure (2020)

References

External links

The Last Confederate: The Story of Robert Adams
ThinkFilm
Los Angeles Times review of The Last Confederate
 Monsters and Critics review of The Last Confederate
 S.C.L.O.S. review of The Last Confederate
 Phantom on IMDb

Male actors from South Carolina
American male film actors
American film producers
American male screenwriters
Sewanee: The University of the South alumni
Georgia Tech alumni
Year of birth missing (living people)
Living people
21st-century American male actors
Writers from Columbia, South Carolina
Male actors from Columbia, South Carolina
Screenwriters from South Carolina
People from Columbia, South Carolina